International Observer is a British-New Zealand musical duo formed by Tom Bailey, musician and ex-lead singer of the British band the Thompson Twins, which rose to fame during the 1980s. Its debut album, Seen, featured Māori visual artist Rakai Karaitiana as part of the project.

Career
Following from the ashes of both the Thompson Twins and subsequent group Babble, Bailey had taken to producing the New Zealand band Stellar* while still residing in the country (Bailey would subsequently move back to Europe in 2005). The success of this collaboration allowed him to focus on his own music, which had moved into the world of dub music, or chill music, as it is sometimes referred to in New Zealand.

The initial venture into the public consciousness was through playing festivals in New Zealand. The success of his two-hour sets allowed Bailey to build a following for International Observer.  When time came to compile a studio recording, there were enough pieces to complete a boxed set. The debut release was Seen, which was released initially on the project's own IO Audio label. However, when the album emerged in the UK, the Birmingham-based dub label Different Drummer took on the task of distributing the album. After the release of the debut album, and prior to Bailey's relocation to Europe, Karaitiana left the project.

The second album All Played Out was released in 2005 only in New Zealand on the Round Trip label. The album contained unreleased music that had been initially recorded for the Seen album.

In 2007, third album Heard saw a more international release on Dubmission Records, as Bailey moved back to Europe to live in France, and perform live at several dates in the UK.  For the widening audience of the project, and with aspirations towards the US market, Heard contained a mixture of tracks from the All Played Out album, as well as "London" from the Seen EP, live and further unreleased cuts.  The album also featured a cover created by his new wife and artist Lauren Drescher.

The fourth album Felt was released in 2009 and features a take on the classic folk song "House of the Rising Sun".

In 2018, Bailey released his fifth album Free from the Dungeons of Dub, which featured thirteen tracks from his Dungeons of Dub series, gilded with the addition of three brand new dubs recorded over the last 18 months, one of which is an exclusive remix of the title track of his brand new pop album, Science Fiction.

Bailey formed an audio visual project The Bailey Salgado Project with the renowned astronomer José Francisco Salgado in 2010.

Discography

Albums

References

External links
Bandcamp site
Unofficial site
Thompson Twins/Babble/IO newsgroup

Rock music duos